Riccardo Antoniazzi (19 December 1853 – 10 November 1912) was an Italian violin maker, the brother of Romeo Antoniazzi.

Early life and career 
Antoniazzi was born in Cremona, the sixth child and pupil of Gaetano, and was the most consistent violin maker of his family. He lived somewhat in the shadow of Leandro Bisiach, and he did not sign many of the instruments from his best period. 

His instruments can be divided into three periods: from his apprenticeship and early development until about 1887–8, during which he made instruments similar to those of his father; his best period, which lasted until about 1904, during which he developed his own style and worked primarily for Leandro Bisiach; and the period from about 1904 when he worked for the firm Monzino and Sons, during which he made beautiful instruments although working with less care, especially with regard to the varnish. Today these are his best-known instruments. 

He used a great variety of models, and his varnish was yellow-orange or at times dark red. He is known to have used four different labels, and he also used a brand during his time with Monzino, with his initials A.R. inside a double circle surmounted by a cross. This brand is often attributed to Romeo, but it seems that he never used it.

Death 
He died in Milan.

References

External links
La Liuteria Italiana / Italian Violin Making in the 1800s and 1900s - Umberto Azzolina
I Maestri Del Novicento - Carlo Vettori 
La Liuteria Lombarda del '900 - Roberto Codazzi, Cinzia Manfredini  2002
Dictionary of 20th Century Italian Violin Makers - Marlin Brinser 1978 
 
 
Walter Hamma, Meister Italienischer Geigenbaukunst, Wilhelmshaven 1993, 

1853 births
1912 deaths
Luthiers from Cremona
19th-century Italian musicians